The Dreams of Children is the fourth studio album by new-age group Shadowfax, the third for Windham Hill Records.

Track listing
 "Another Country" (Chuck Greenberg) – 4:20
 "Snowline" (Greenberg) – 4:30
 "The Big Song" (David C. Lewis, G. E. Stinson) – 4:00
 "The Dreams of Children" (Greenberg) – 4:50
 "Word from the Village" (Stinson) – 4:40
 "Kindred Spirits" (Stinson) – 4:15
 "Shaman Song" (Phil Maggini) – 5:20
 "Above the Wailing Wall" (Stinson) – 4:50

Personnel
G. E. Stinson – 6- and 12-string guitar, effects vocals
Chuck Greenberg – Lyricon, tenor saxophone, soprano saxophone, stone flute
Phil Maggini – bass
Stuart Nevitt – drums, percussion, boobams
Jamii Szmadzinski – violin, baritone violin
David C. Lewis – Yamaha DX7, Memorymoog, Steinway grand piano

Additional personnel
Morris Dollison – vocal on 5, guitar on 1
Michael Spiro – bàtá drums on 1, crotales on 1 2, caxixi on 1, bells on 2, chimes on 2
Hara Lambi A. – vocal on 8
Adam Rudolph – shekere on 5 7, talking drums on 5, clay pots on 7, caxixi on 7, turtle shell on 7, fra fra bell on 7 8, berimbau on 7, clay drums on 8, angklung on 8, cowbells on 8, rattles on 8

Charts

References 

Shadowfax (band) albums
1984 albums
Windham Hill Records albums